The Royal Tweed Bridge is a road bridge in Berwick-upon-Tweed, Northumberland, England crossing the River Tweed. It was intended to divert traffic from the 17th century Berwick Bridge, and until the 1980s it formed part of the A1 road, the main route from London to Edinburgh. However, the construction of the A1 River Tweed Bridge to the west of Berwick has since reduced the Royal Tweed Bridge's importance.

History
It was designed by L.G. Mouchel & Partners, with consulting engineers Charles Bressey and J. H. Bean, and the contractors for construction were Holloway Brothers of London.

Construction took place between 1925 and 1928. The total cost of the bridge was £180,000, and up to 170 workers were employed during its construction. It was opened by the then Prince of Wales, later Edward VIII, on 16 May 1928.

It was built to supplement the older Berwick Bridge a short distance downstream, which still carries road traffic. A bridge had first been proposed in 1896, and a scheme was produced in 1914, but the outbreak of the First World War meant that plans were put on hold until 1924. A seven-arched stone bridge was proposed at this time, but eventually the concrete design was decided upon.

The bridge was repaired in 1980, as it had been damaged by de-icing salt and its proximity to the sea. The A1 River Tweed Bridge, which opened in 1984, now carries the A1 road about a mile to the west of the Royal Tweed Bridge, reducing its importance as a crossing of the Tweed.

It is a Grade II* listed building in recognition of its innovative design and striking scale.

Design
The bridge is built from reinforced concrete and consists of four unequal arches, with approach viaducts at each end. The northern end of the bridge is higher, and towards that end the spans are longer.

The spans consist of four arched ribs, solid in the case of the shortest span and hollow for the longer spans. Columns rise from the ribs and are connected at the top by longitudinal beams, which support perpendicular beams that carry the roadway. The piers and abutments are constructed from mass concrete, and there are expansion joints and a system of wind braces over each of the piers.

The parapets are made of dressed sandstone, and there are cast iron lamposts on either side of the roadway.

At the time of its construction, it held the record for the longest single concrete span in the UK.

References

External links

 
 Photo of underside of bridge

Bridges across the River Tweed
Berwick-upon-Tweed
Bridges completed in 1928
Deck arch bridges
Concrete bridges in the United Kingdom
Grade II* listed buildings in Northumberland